Sanseong station is a railway station on Seoul Subway Line 8.

Station layout

References

Seoul Metropolitan Subway stations
Metro stations in Seongnam
Railway stations opened in 1996